Roberto Manzin (born 8 July 1966) is an alto, tenor and soprano saxophones, clarinet, EWI, piano player and composer.

Biography
Roberto Manzin was born on 8 July 1966 in Rome, Italy, of Eastern European refugees who were also musicians. His musical life began in Milan where he moved with his family when he was five, he studied music privately and then at the school Civica Scuola di Musica Villa Simonetta.

During the 1980s Manzin begun playing in several music clubs in Milan, and during the 1990s was part of the Tony Scott Jazz Quintet (Scott being an American bebop clarinet player who performed with Charlie Parker and Billie Holiday). Manzin became a successful session player, contributing to eight albums in 1992 alone, with leading Italian artists as well as featuring in several TV commercials (Invicta, BMW, TV Sorrisi e Canzoni, etc.). Manzin performed regularly in Milan jazz clubs such as Il Capolinea, Le Scimmie, Tangram, with Italian jazz musicians such as Renato Sellani, Bruno De Filippi, Gianni Cazzola, Tullio De Piscopo, Giorgio Buratti and Marco Ratti. In the same period he toured with the Italian singer Enzo Jannacci and the American artist Gene Anthony Ray (who played the role of Leroy Johnson in Fame). Manzin also worked extensively in TV where he played with, among others, James Brown, Zucchero Fornaciari and Manu Katché.
In the late 1990s Manzin migrated to London, where he continued his musical activity.
Over the years Manzin has performed and/or recorded with Martha Reeves and the Vandelas, Donna Summer, Dave Weckl, Jim Mullen, Harvie S, Pino Palladino, Trilok Gurtu, Kai Eckhardt, Dennis Rollins, Roberto Pla, Roland Perrin, Richard Bailey, Ernesto Simpson, Nicolas Meier, Jason Rebello, Ska Cubano, Manolín "El Médico de la salsa", Jesus Cutiño, Omar Puente, Alejandro Sanz, Rumer, Ismael Rivera Jr, Max Carletti, Carmel, Mario Biondi, Space UK, Dave Land, Adrian Reid; Maysa Leak, Francesco Lo Castro, Sid Gauld and Francesco Mendolia (from Incognito) and many others. Manzin continues to be a popular session player (he recorded on eight albums in 2010, ranging in style from Pop to Latin, Rock/Blues, Ska and Jazz) and appears in music festivals throughout Europe, as well as performing regularly at many venues around Europe.

Discography

As leader and co-leader
 Roberto Manzin, Redbeetroots 'Blue Feather' 2021
 Roberto Manzin, Davide Incorvaia 'Freedom Chant' EP 2021
 Roberto Manzin 'LifeFlight' 2016
 Roberto Manzin - Francesco Lo Castro 'Improfives' Manzin - Lo Castro HMP 2010
 Giorgio Serci - Roberto Manzin 'Silver Lining' Seadas Records 2009
 Roberto Manzin 'Sax Project' Duck Record 1989

As sideman
 Llareggub 'Llareggub' MoPaChi Records 2017
 Dan Banks 'Two In a Box' 2017
 Jordan & The Gigolos 'Covered Up' 2017
 Malafede Trio 'Touche' 2016
 Eliane Correa 'En El Aire' 2016
 Wild Card 'Organic Riot' Top End Records 2015
 Calvin Gudu 'Above All' PraiseWorth Records 2013
 Mario Biondi (musician) 'Mario Christmas' Sony 2013
 Laura Mvula 'Sing To The Moon' RCA Victor 2013
 Wymondham College Jazz Orchestra 'Birdland' 2012
 Wild Card 'Everything Changes' Top End Records 2012
 Filipe Monteiro 'In Bad Company' 2012
 David Sharp 'Now And Then - Songs & Instrumental - Part 1 & 2' Sonoton 2012
 Romina De Luca 'DeCantare' Edel 2011
 Rom D Collective 'Energy in Motion' 2011
 Stephen Dale Petit 'The BBC Sessions' 333 Records, BBC 2011
 David Lawrence Atkins 'Spitting On A Fish' 2011
 Petty Cash & the trash 'The Dogs Need Valium' 2011
 Rumer (musician) 'Seasons of My Soul' Atlantic Records 2010
 Jon Scott 'Flow like a river' Brown Babes Music 2010
 Stephen Dale Petit 'The Crave' 333 Records Ltd 2010
 The Red Reverend 'Spacejazz Hymnbook Vol. 1' RedReverend 2010
 Contigo en la distancia 'Contigo en la distancia' RTZ 2010
 Ska Cubano 'Mambo Ska' Casino Sounds 2010
 Federico Malaman 'Enjoy with me!' 2010
 Jon Scott 'Give Me A Call' Brown Babes Music 2009
 Mario Biondi (musician) 'If' Tattica 2009
 Gino Marcelli 'Suoni Confusi' Do It Yourself Music Group S.r.l. 2009
 Stephen Dale Petit 'Guitararama' 333 Records Ltd. 2007
 Luciano Gattinoni 'La mela rossa' Rugginenti Editore 2007
 'ZoogaJazz Three' Zoog a Music 2007
 Mauro Gazzola 'On The Road. Fusion Music Voyage' NAR International 2006
 Franco Morgia 'La musica o l'amore' Idea 2006
 Gaetano Borgo 'Se uno vuol essere il primo...' ELLEDICI 2006
 Yano 'Alegria' Self 2005
 'Zoog a Jazz' Zoog a Music 2005
 Victor Hugo la banda 'Topicalisimo' Las records 2002
 Antonio Forcione 'Ghetto Paradise' NAIM Label 1999
 Shashi & friends 'Longing' Happy Times Unlimited 1999
 Arno Stubel 'Passage to Argentina' Tring 1997
 Alejandro Sanz 'Más (album)' Wea/Latina (Warner Music Group) 1997
 Graecia 'Keep The Faith' Mercury Records (Germany) 1996
 Petty Cash and the Trash 'It still fits' Patricia A. Tesman & Bruno Finzi 1996
 Ferraro Live Plan 'Sax 'Oh' Dream Beat 1996
 Gigliola Cinquetti 'Giovane Vecchio Cuore' Mercury 1995
 Patricia Manterola 'Hambre de Amor' Fonovisa Records Inc. 1995
 Vanni Stefanini 'Sun Shower' Rugginenti Editore 1994
 Historia 'Voglia di cantare' Bebas Record 1994
 Historia 'Il meglio degli Historia - Vol. 2' Bebas Record 1994
 B.o.b. boys 'B.o.b boys' 1994
 883 (band) 'Nord Sud-Ovest Est' FRI 1993
 Alejandra Guzmán 'Libre (Alejandra Guzmán album)' RCA Records International 1993
 Quelli di Vicolo Corto 'Cover' Duck Record 1993
 Ricchi e poveri 'Allegro italiano' EMI Records 1992
 Enrico Musiani 'Cuore cerca cuore' Duck record 1992
 Night flight 'That's it' DDD (BMG Ariola) Ariola Records 1992
 Mediterranée 2 'Background music' HI-LITE productions 1992
 Historia 'Il meglio degli Historia' Duck Record 1992
 Franco Morgia 'I grandi successi di Franco Morgia' Duck Record 1992
 Franky Rogers 'Amore e Rabbia' Duck Gold 1992
 Marina Barone 'Le stagioni del cuore' Duck Record 1992
 Dario Baldan Bembo 'Un pò per vivere, un pò per sognare' Five Record 1991
 White Christmas Orchestra 'Merry Christmas' Duck Records 1991
 Ran 'Nonfirmato' HI-LITE productions 1991
Christian 'L'amore è una cosa meravigliosa' Duck Record 1991
 TV Movie Soundtrack Il sassofono with Amanda Sandrelli RAI TV Italy 1991
 Tukano 'Carnaval 90' Dub Record 1990
 Tony Ciasky 'Un altro dentro te" America Records 1988

References

External links
 Roberto Manzin playing with Renato Sellani, Italian TV, RAI 3, Il Circolo Delle 12 - 1992
 Roberto Manzin playing with Rumer, BBC, Later with Jools Holland - 2010
 Roberto Manzin playing with James Brown, Italian TV, Canale 5, Buona Domenica - 1995
 The Jazz Discography - Musician List
 Facebook presence

1966 births
Living people
Musicians from Rome
Italian musicians
Italian jazz saxophonists